Rupayan City Cumilla (Bengali: রুপায়ন সিটি কুমিল্লা) is a professional franchise field hockey team based in Cumilla, which competes in Hockey Champions Trophy  Bangladesh. Founded in 2022, the team is owned by Rupayan Group. It's one of the six founding teams of the league. Kim Young Kyu serves as the teams head coach.

History
Established in 2022 by the Rupayan Group, as one of the founding members of the Hockey Champions Trophy, the team announed that Kim Young Kyu, the former South Korea national team head coach from 2001 till 2004, would serve as their first foreign coach. While former Bangladesh national team captain, Mosiur Rahman Biplob was appointed as the assistant coach.

During the player draft, Rupayan Group Cumilla snapped up national team players Sohanur Rahman Sabuj (icon player), Sarower Hossain and Puskar Khisa Mimo, while also attaining the services of Jasjit Singh Kular, who was part of the Indian team at the 2014 Men's Hockey World Cup.

Roster

Personnel

Current technical staff

References

Bangladesh
Hockey
Sports clubs established in 2022
Field hockey in Bangladesh